Hydropower is the most used form of renewable energy in Russia, and there is large potential in Russia for more use of hydropower.
According to the International Hydropower Association Russia is the seventh largest producer of hydroelectricity in 2020. 
It is also second in the world for hydro potential, yet only 20% of this potential is developed. 
Russia is home to 9% of the world's hydro resources, mostly in Siberia and the country's far east. 
At the end of 2005, the generating capacity from hydroelectric sources in Russia was 45,700 MW, and an additional 5,648 MW was under construction. The World Energy Council believes that Russia has much potential for using its hydro resources, with a theoretical potential of about 2,295 TWh/yr, with 852 TWh being economically feasible.

The largest dams in Russia are the Sayano-Shushenskaya Dam, which has an installed capacity of 6,400 MW; the Krasnoyarsk Dam (6,000 MW); the Bratsk Dam (4,500 MW); the Ust-Ilimsk Dam (4,320 MW) and the Zeya Dam (1,330 MW). Some of the most recent dam projects are the Bureya Dam (2010 MW) and the Irganai Dam (800 MW). The Boguchany Dam (1920 MW), Zelenchuk Dam (320 MW), Zaramag Dam (352 MW) and Nizhne-Chereksky (60 MW) are currently under construction. RusHydro is the largest hydroelectric company in Russia and the second largest hydroelectric producer in the world. In October 2010, China Yangtze Power, the largest hydropower corporation in China, and EuroSibEnergo, a Russian energy company, signed a cooperation agreement to expand hydroelectric energy production in Russia and export energy to China's northern territories.

Largest hydropower plants

Accidents
On 17 August 2009, there was an explosion at the Sayano-Shushenskaya hydroelectric power plant, which killed 75 plant workers and injured 13. The Federal Service for Ecological, Technological, and Nuclear Supervision's investigation concluded that poor management and technical flaws were responsible. The explosion was caused by a 29-year-old turbine that experienced an uncontrolled and excessive vibration. Since then, officials from RusHydro, the operator of the plant, have called for better oversight and safety at hydroelectric plants.

See also
 Renewable energy in Russia

References